Cartier Niko Goodrum (born February 28, 1992) is an American professional baseball utility player in the Boston Red Sox organization. He previously played in  Major League Baseball (MLB) for the Minnesota Twins, Detroit Tigers and Houston Astros.  Goodrum has played every fielding position in his major league career except pitcher and catcher.

Career

Minnesota Twins
Goodrum attended Fayette County High School in Fayetteville, Georgia. The Minnesota Twins selected Goodrum in the second round, with the 71st overall selection, of the 2010 Major League Baseball draft. He signed, receiving a  $514,800 signing bonus, and made his professional debut with the Gulf Coast Twins of the Rookie-level Gulf Coast League.

With the Elizabethton Twins of the Rookie-level Appalachian League in 2011, Goodrum had a .275 batting average. For the Cedar Rapids Kernals of the Class A Midwest League in 2013, Goodrum batted .260. In 2014, Goodrum played for the Fort Myers Miracle of the Class A-Advanced Florida State League, where he batted .249 with 3 home runs and 49 RBI's and he transitioned from shortstop to third base. Goodrum spent 2015 with both Fort Myers and the Chattanooga Lookouts of the Class AA Southern League, where he posted a combined .232 batting average with nine home runs and 38 RBIs.

Goodrum began the 2017 season with the Rochester Red Wings of the Class AAA International League. The Twins promoted him to the major leagues on September 1. He was outrighted to AAA on November 3, 2017. He elected free agency on November 6, 2017.

Detroit Tigers
Goodrum signed a minor league contract with the Detroit Tigers on November 25, 2017. The deal included an invitation to the Tigers' 2018 spring training camp.  After a strong spring season, which included hitting four home runs, Goodrum made the Tigers' 25-man opening day roster.

Goodrum hit his first major league home run on April 5, 2018 off Joakim Soria of the Chicago White Sox. On May 14, he hit two home runs while driving in five in a 6–3 Tigers win over the Cleveland Indians.

Goodrum finished the 2018 season with a .245 batting average, 16 home runs, 53 RBI, and 12 stolen bases, while playing six positions in the field (all four infield positions, plus left field and right field). He was awarded the 2018 Detroit Tigers Rookie of the Year Award in voting by members of Detroit Sports Media Association.

In a May 31, 2019 game against the Atlanta Braves, Goodrum went 5-for-5 with a double and two home runs. He became the first Tigers player to go 5-for-5 with at least three extra-base hits and two home runs in a game since Dmitri Young in 2003, and the first Tigers shortstop to collect five hits in a game since Alan Trammell in 1987. He also was the first player to have five hits while playing for the first time in his home state since Ohio-born Pete Susko did so for the Washington Senators at Cleveland in 1934. Goodrum was placed on the 10-day injured list on August 24 due to an adductor strain. He did not return the rest of the season. For the year, Goodrum hit .248 with 12 home runs and 45 RBI in 423 at-bats.

Overall with the 2020 Detroit Tigers, Goodrum batted .184 with five home runs and 20 RBIs in 43 games.

On January 15, 2021, the Tigers and Goodrum agreed to a one-year, $2.1 million contract, avoiding arbitration. Goodrum played 90 games for the 2021 Tigers, batting .214 with 9 home runs, 33 RBI and 14 stolen bases. The Tigers removed Goodrum from the 40-man roster following the 2021 season. On November 19, 2021, Goodrum cleared waivers and elected free agency.

Houston Astros
On March 15, 2022, Goodrum signed a one-year, $2.1 million contract with the Houston Astros.  He batted .116 in 15 games for Houston before they optioned him to the Sugar Land Space Cowboys of the Class AAA Pacific Coast League. On September 1, Goodrum was designated for assignment. He cleared waivers and became a free agent on September 3.

Boston Red Sox
On December 21 2022, Goodrum signed a minor-league contract with the Boston Red Sox.

Personal life
Goodrum's father, Tim, played college football for Fort Valley State University.

On June 11, 2018, after learning about the Flint water crisis, Goodrum donated 1,440 cases of water to residents of Flint.

References

External links

1992 births
African-American baseball players
Baseball players from Georgia (U.S. state)
Cedar Rapids Kernels players
Chattanooga Lookouts players
Detroit Tigers players
Elizabethton Twins players
Fort Myers Miracle players
Gulf Coast Twins players
Houston Astros players
Lakeland Flying Tigers players
Living people
Major League Baseball infielders
Major League Baseball left fielders
Major League Baseball right fielders
Minnesota Twins players
People from Fayetteville, Georgia
Rochester Red Wings players
Sportspeople from the Atlanta metropolitan area
Sugar Land Space Cowboys players
Toledo Mud Hens players
21st-century African-American sportspeople
Caribes de Anzoátegui players
American expatriate baseball players in Venezuela